The Schinkel school (Schinkelschule) was a German architectural style active from 1840 to the end of the 19th century. It is named after its head, Karl Friedrich Schinkel.

See also 
 Rundbogenstil

Architectural styles